Andreas Sabroe (born 22 December 1982) is a Danish ice hockey player currently playing for the Nordsjælland Cobras in the Oddset Ligaen. Sabroe began his career with the Gladsaxe Bears in 1999.  He moved to Rungsted IK in 2001 before joined the Cobras in 2004.

References

External links

1982 births
Danish ice hockey players
Living people
Place of birth missing (living people)
21st-century Danish people